Ram Inthra is a khwaeng (subdistrict) of Khan Na Yao District, in Bangkok, Thailand. Named after Ram Inthra Road, the subdistrict was created in 2009. In 2020, it had a total population of 49,017 people.

References

Subdistricts of Bangkok
Khan Na Yao district